Sylte is a village in Surnadal Municipality in Møre og Romsdal county, Norway. The farming village is located at the end of the Surnadalsfjorden at the mouth of the river Surna.

References

Surnadal
Villages in Møre og Romsdal